Augusto Pinto Duarte Maia, known as Leão (born 22 April 1971) is a Portuguese football coach and a former player.

He played 13 seasons and 287 games in the Primeira Liga for Salgueiros, União de Leiria and Sporting.

Club career
He made his Primeira Liga debut for Salgueiros on 19 August 1990 as a starter in a 1–2 loss against Tirsense.

References

1971 births
Footballers from Porto
Living people
Portuguese footballers
S.C. Salgueiros players
Primeira Liga players
Sporting CP footballers
U.D. Leiria players
Leixões S.C. players
Liga Portugal 2 players
Portuguese football managers
Association football midfielders